Ball o' Ditton is a village in Cheshire, England.

References

External links

Villages in Cheshire